Con Kenney (21 June 1896 – 17 February 1959) was an Australian rules footballer who played with Melbourne in the Victorian Football League (VFL).

Notes

External links 

 

1896 births
1959 deaths
Australian rules footballers from Victoria (Australia)
Melbourne Football Club players